Churchill Butte is a summit in the U.S. state of Nevada.

Churchill Butte was named after nearby Fort Churchill.

References

Mountains of Lyon County, Nevada